Konstantinos Andriolas (Greek: Κωνσταντίνος Ανδριόλας; born 1 May 1985) is a Greek footballer currently playing for Ethnikos Piraeus.

Career

Senior career
His career started in the Super League Greece as a footballer (goalkeeper) in Halkidona. After the merging of Atromitos  with Halkidona he continues as player of Atromitos from 2005 to 2008. The young goalkeeper contract agreement with Panionios for the period 2008–2010. In June 2010, Andriolas signed a 2-year contract with Panthrakikos.

Career statistics

Last update: 30 July 2010

Greece U-21
Andriolas, during 2004–2006 period participated for the Greece U-21 in 6 games:
 5 May 2004 Greece-Ukraine 1–2
 19 May 2004 Greece-Cyprus 0–1
 17 August 2005 Belgium-Greece 0–1
 6 September 2005 Kazakhstan-Greece 1–2
 11 October 2005 Greece-Georgia 3–0
 6 September 2006 Belgium-Greece 2–1

References

External links
 
 Insports
 Guardian Football

1985 births
Living people
Atromitos F.C. players
Chalkidona F.C. players
Ethnikos Piraeus F.C. players
Panionios F.C. players
Panthrakikos F.C. players
Association football goalkeepers
Thrasyvoulos F.C. players
A.O. Glyfada players
Footballers from Athens
Greek footballers